Al-Bishi is an Arabic family name.

People
 Abdulrahman Al-Bishi, Saudi footballer
 Fahad Al-Bishi, Saudi footballer
 Hamdan Al-Bishi, Saudi athlete
 Hamed Al-Bishi, Saudi athlete
 Mohamed Al-Bishi, Saudi footballer
 Sultan Al-Bishi, Saudi footballer

Arabic-language surnames